SoMo is the debut self-titled studio album by American singer SoMo. It was released on April 8, 2014, by Republic Records. The album's production was primarily handled by Mick Schultz and Cody Tarpley.

Background
On February 12, 2014, SoMo announced the release date of his self-titled debut album set for April 8, 2014.

Singles
On December 7, 2013, the first single "Ride" was released. On January 17, 2014, the music video was released for "Ride".

"Show Off" was sent to US Rhythmic radio on April 8, 2014 as the second single off of the album.

"Hush" was released as the third single from the album, the music video was released on October 6, 2014.

Commercial performance
The album debuted at #6 on the Billboard 200 with around 20,000–25,000 units sold. It also entered the Billboard Top R&B/Hip-Hop Albums at #2, the highest debut for an artist since November 2013.

Track listing

Personnel
Credits for SoMo adapted from Allmusic.

 Eric Peterson – mastering
 Brian Schultz – bass
 Mick Schultz – bass, composer, drums, engineer, guitar, keyboards, percussion, producer, programming
 John Somers-Morales – guitar
 Joseph Somers-Morales – primary artist, composer, executive producer
 Cody Tarpley – additional production, bass, composer, engineer, guitar, keyboards

Charts

Weekly charts

Year-end charts

Certifications

References

2014 debut albums
SoMo albums
Republic Records albums